North San Juan is a census-designated place in Nevada County, California, United States, along State Route 49 on the San Juan Ridge in Gold Country.  The zip code is 95960. The population was 269 at the 2010 census.

History
The community's beginnings date back to the California Gold Rush and it prospered during the era of hydraulic mining at nearby Malakoff Diggins State Historic Park from 1850–1884. Beginning in 1867, it was included on the route for the first long-distance telephone line, a historical landmark, between French Corral and French Lake.

In 1880, the population was 675.

The original name San Juan was bestowed by a veteran of the Mexican–American War who settled there in 1853 because he thought the site looked like San Juan de Ulúa near Veracruz. When the post office opened in 1857 "North" was added to distinguish it from San Juan in San Benito County.

Geography
According to the United States Census Bureau, the CDP covers an area of 2.4 square miles (6.3 km), all of it land.

Climate
According to the Köppen Climate Classification system, North San Juan has a warm-summer Mediterranean climate, abbreviated "Csa" on climate maps.

Demographics
The 2010 United States Census reported that North San Juan had a population of 269. The racial makeup of North San Juan was 224 (83.3%) White, 1 (0.4%) African American, 12 (4.5%) Native American, 11 (4.1%) Asian, 0 (0.0%) Pacific Islander, 0 (0.0%) from other races, and 21 (7.8%) from two or more races. Hispanic or Latino of any race were 9 persons (3.3%).

The Census reported that 269 people (100% of the population) lived in households, 0 (0%) lived in non-institutionalized group quarters, and 0 (0%) were institutionalized.

There were 130 households, out of which 25 (19.2%) had children under the age of 18 living in them, 38 (29.2%) were opposite-sex married couples living together, 17 (13.1%) had a female householder with no husband present, 7 (5.4%) had a male householder with no wife present.  There were 13 (10.0%) unmarried opposite-sex partnerships, and 0 (0%) same-sex married couples or partnerships. 51 households (39.2%) were made up of individuals, and 13 (10.0%) had someone living alone who was 65 years of age or older. The average household size was 2.07.  There were 62 families (47.7% of all households); the average family size was 2.71.

The population was spread out, with 43 people (16.0%) under the age of 18, 10 people (3.7%) aged 18 to 24, 67 people (24.9%) aged 25 to 44, 111 people (41.3%) aged 45 to 64, and 38 people (14.1%) who were 65 years of age or older.  The median age was 49.8 years. For every 100 females, there were 124.2 males.  For every 100 females age 18 and over, there were 115.2 males.

The homeowner vacancy rate was 1.6%; the rental vacancy rate was 0%.  137 people (50.9% of the population) lived in owner-occupied housing units and 132 people (49.1%) lived in rental housing units.

Politics

See also

References

External links
 Official North San Juan website

Census-designated places in Nevada County, California
Mining communities of the California Gold Rush
Populated places in the Sierra Nevada (United States)
Populated places established in 1850
1850 establishments in California
Census-designated places in California